Victor Cornelius Medvei  FRCP (6 June 1905 – 18 October 2000) was a Hungarian physician and president of the History of Medicine Society of the Royal Society of Medicine from 1986 to 1987.

References 

Presidents of the History of Medicine Society
Fellows of the Royal College of Physicians
1905 births
2000 deaths
20th-century Hungarian physicians
Commanders of the Order of the British Empire
Presidents of the Osler Club of London